Futbol Club Ordino is an Andorran football club based in Ordino. The club currently plays in Primera Divisió.

History
Founded in 2010 as a football academy, FC Ordino currently plays the Primera Divisió, after it was admitted by the clubs of the league in 2012. In May 2013, Ordino were promoted to the top division, after winning every game they played in the Segona Divisió. Argentine footballer Javier Saviola joined as an assistant coach in September 2016. The club has successfully reached two Andorran Cup semifinals during the 2014–15 season, against Lusitans, and the 2016–17 season, against Sant Julià. In the 2016–17 regular season they were relegated to the second tier in the playout with a 3–5 on aggregate against Penya Encarnada d'Andorra. At the end of 2017–18 season, the team returns to the first tier after finishing 1st in Segona Divisió.

FC Ordino has often been thought of as an example of small but ambitious and successful young club.

Current squad

Honours
 Segona Divisió
Winners (2) : 2012–13, 2017–18

League history

Former managers
Carlos Sánchez Muñoz  (2012–13)
Carles Vallverdú  (2013)
Salvador Estruch  (2013)
José Luis Duque  (2013–2014)
Víctor Manuel Torres Mestre  (2014)
José Quereda  (2014–15)
Miguel Ángel Lozano  (2015–2016)
Paco Domingo  (2016–present)

References

External links
[ Official website]

Football clubs in Andorra
Association football clubs established in 2010
2010 establishments in Andorra
Ordino